Cuyahoga County ( or ) is a large urban county located in the northeastern part of the U.S. state of Ohio. It is situated on the southern shore of Lake Erie, across the U.S.-Canada maritime border. As of the 2020 census, its population was 1,264,817, making it the second-most-populous county in the state.

The county seat and largest city is Cleveland. The county is bisected by the Cuyahoga River, after which it was named. "Cuyahoga" is an Iroquoian word meaning "crooked river". Cuyahoga County is the core of the Greater Cleveland Metropolitan Area and of the Cleveland–Akron–Canton combined statistical area.

History

The land that became Cuyahoga County was previously part of the French colony of Canada (New France), which was ceded in 1763 to Great Britain and renamed Province of Quebec. In the early 1790s, the land became part of the Connecticut Western Reserve in the Northwest Territory, and it was purchased by the Connecticut Land Company in 1795. Cleveland was established one year later by General Moses Cleaveland near the mouth of the Cuyahoga River.

Cuyahoga County was created on June 7, 1807, and organized on May 1, 1810. Cleveland (then known as "Cleaveland") was selected as the county seat in 1809. The county was later reduced in size by the creation of Huron, Lake, and Lorain counties.

In 1831, former U.S. President James A. Garfield was born in what was at the time Cuyahoga County's Orange Township.

Geography
It is the second-largest county in Ohio by area. A portion of Cuyahoga Valley National Park is in the county's southeastern section.

Adjacent counties
 Lake County (northeast)
 Geauga County (east)
 Summit County (southeast)
 Medina County (southwest)
 Lorain County (west)
 Portage County (southeast)

Demographics

As of the 2010 census,  1,280,122 people, 571,457 households, and 319,996 families were residing in the county. The population density was 2,800 people/sq mi (1,081/km2). The 621,763 housing units averaged 1,346 per sq mi (520/km2). The racial makeup of the county was 63.6% White, 29.7% African American, 0.2% Native American, 2.6% Asian (0.9% Indian, 0.7% Chinese, 0.3% Filipino, 0.2% Korean, 0.2% Vietnamese, 0.1% Japanese),  1.8% from other races, and 2.1% from two or more races. About 4.8% of the population were Hispanics or Latinos of any race (3.1% Puerto Rican, 0.7% Mexican, 0.1% Dominican, 0.1% Guatemalan). Further, 16.5% were of German, 12.8% Irish, 8.8% Italian, 8.1% Polish, 5.9% English, 3.7% Slovak, and 3.1% Hungarian heritage.

Sizable numbers of Russians (1.7%), French, (1.4%), Arabs (1.4%), Ukrainians (1.2%), and Greeks (0.7%) were residing in the county; as their first language, 88.4% spoke English, 3.7% Spanish, and 4.9% some other Indo-European language. In addition, 7.3% of the population were foreign-born (of which 44.4% were born in Europe, 36.3% in Asia, and 12.1% in Latin America).

Of the 571,457 households, 28.5% had children under 18 living with them, 42.4% were married couples living together, 15.7% had a female householder with no husband present, and 37.9% were not families. About 32.8% of all households consisted of single individuals, and 12.1% consisted of someone living alone who was 65 or older. The average household size was 2.39, and the average family size was 3.06.

The age distribution in the county was as follows: 25.0% under 18, 8.0% between 18 and 24, 29.3% between 25 and 44, 22.2% between 45 and 64, and 15.6% who were 65 or older. The median age was 37 years old. For every 100 females, there were 89.5 males. For every 100 females age 18 and over, there were 85.2 males.

The median income in the county was $43,603 for a household and $58,631 and for a family. The county’s per capita income was $26,263. About 10.3% of families, 19.4% of those under age 18, and 9.3% of those age 65 or over, and 13.1% of the population as a whole was living below the poverty line.

Government

The Cuyahoga County Council and Executive exercise direct government over unincorporated areas of Cuyahoga County. As of 2012, this consisted of two small areas: Chagrin Falls Township and Olmsted Township.

Cuyahoga County had long been led by a three-member Board of County Commissioners, which is the default form of county government in the state. In July 2008, Federal Bureau of Investigation agents began raiding the offices of Cuyahoga County Commissioners and those of a wide range of cities, towns, and villages across Cuyahoga County. The investigation revealed extensive bribery and corruption across the area, affecting hundreds of millions of dollars in county contracts and business. The investigation led to the arrest of county commissioner Jimmy Dimora; county auditor Frank Russo; MetroHealth vice president John J. Carroll; former Strongsville councilman Patrick Coyne; former Ohio District Courts of Appeals judge Anthony O. Calabrese III; former Cuyahoga County Court of Common Pleas judge Bridget McCafferty; Cuyahoga County Sheriff Gerald McFaul; former Cleveland City Council member Sabra Pierce Scott; Cuyahoga County Court of Common Pleas judge Steven Terry; and a wide range of attorneys, building inspectors, consultants, contractors, school district employees, and mid and low level county workers.

On November 3, 2009, county voters overwhelmingly approved the adoption of a new county charter, which replaced the three-commissioner form of county government with an elected county executive and county prosecutor, and an 11-member county council. Each council member represents a single geographic district, with no at-large districts. The elected offices of auditor, clerk of courts, coroner, engineer, recorder, sheriff, and treasurer were abolished. The county executive was given authority to appoint individuals to these offices, which became part of the executive branch of the county. Summit County is the only other Ohio county with this form of government.

In the November 2, 2010, election, Lakewood Mayor Ed FitzGerald (D) defeated Matt Dolan (R) to become the first Cuyahoga County Executive. The first Cuyahoga County Council was also elected, with Democrats winning eight seats, while Republicans won three.

On September 25, 2018, Cuyahoga County passed legislation which specifically protects LGBTQ+ people in their anti-discrimination laws. The protections under the bill specify equal access for the LGBTQ+ community to employment, housing, and public accommodations. The County is one of 20 municipalities in Ohio with this specific protection. Alongside the new language, the legislation creates a three-person Commission of Human Rights for Cuyahoga County which would support citizens looking to file a discrimination complaint. This legislation evokes the Ohio Fairness Act, a bill currently stalled in the House and Senate which would amend this anti-discrimination legislation on a state level.

Politics

Like many major urban counties, Cuyahoga County is heavily Democratic. Given its New England heritage, diverse population, plus union and labor involvement, the county often provides the Democratic Party with the largest margins in Ohio. In the 19th century, the Western Reserve, which Cleveland is the economic center of "was probably the most intensely antislavery section of the country." It last voted Republican at the presidential level in 1972, when Richard Nixon carried it with a plurality. The last Republican presidential candidate to win an absolute majority was Dwight D. Eisenhower in 1956. However, it has occasionally voted Republican in statewide landslides since then, such as for John Kasich in the 2014 gubernatorial election and for George Voinovich in the 2004 Senate election. 

Democratic strength is concentrated in the City of Cleveland and suburbs in eastern Cuyahoga County, such as Shaker Heights and Solon. 

Republican strength is concentrated in the southern Cuyahoga County suburbs, such as Strongsville and North Royalton. Suburbs in western Cuyahoga County, such as North Olmsted and Westlake tend to be more moderate. 

In recent elections, formerly Democratic working-class suburbs such as Middleburg Heights and Parma have trended to the GOP, while formerly GOP upscale suburbs such as Bay Village and Chagrin Falls have trended Democratic.

|}

Education

Colleges and universities
Cuyahoga County is home to a number of higher-education institutions, including:
 Baldwin Wallace University (Berea)
 Bryant and Stratton College (Parma)
 Cleveland Bartending School (Cleveland Heights)
 Case Western Reserve University (Cleveland)
 Cleveland Institute of Art (Cleveland)
 Cleveland Institute of Music (Cleveland)
 Cleveland State University (Cleveland)
 Cuyahoga Community College (Cleveland, Highland Hills, Westlake, and Parma)
 DeVry University (Seven Hills)
 John Carroll University (University Heights)
 Notre Dame College (South Euclid)
 Kent State University College of Podiatric Medicine (Independence)
 Stautzenberger College (Brecksville)
 Ursuline College (Pepper Pike)

K-12 education
School districts include:

 Bay Village City School District
 Beachwood City School District
 Bedford City School District
 Berea City School District
 Brecksville-Broadview Heights City School District
 Brooklyn City School District
 Chagrin Falls Exempted Village School District
 Cleveland Municipal School District
 Cleveland Heights-University Heights City School District
 Cuyahoga Heights Local School District
 East Cleveland City School District
 Euclid City School District
 Fairview Park City School District
 Garfield Heights City School District
 Independence Local School District
 Lakewood City School District
 Maple Heights City School District
 Mayfield City School District
 North Olmsted City School District
 North Royalton City School District
 Olmsted Falls City School District
 Orange City School District
 Parma City School District
 Rocky River City School District
 Richmond Heights Local School District
 Shaker Heights City School District
 Solon City School District
 South Euclid-Lyndhurst City School District
 Strongsville City School District
 Warrensville Heights City School District
 Westlake City School District

Health
In 2014, Cuyahoga County ranked 65 out of 88 counties in Ohio for health outcomes. This ranking was based on multiple factors, including: premature death (7,975 years per 100,000 population, of potential life lost), adults who reported having poor or fair health (15%), average number of poor physical-health days reported in a 30-day period (3.3), average number of poor mental-health days reported in a 30-day period (4.1), and the percentage of births with low birth-weight (10.4%). Among these factors, Cuyahoga did worse than the Ohio average in premature death, poor mental-health days, and low birth-weight. Possible explanations as for why Cuyahoga County is lower in health outcomes than the average Ohio county include behavioral factors, access to clinical care, social and economic factors, and environmental factors.

The leading causes of death and disability in Cuyahoga County are chronic diseases such as cancer, heart disease, obesity, and diabetes. The cancer mortality rate for Cuyahoga is 192.7 per 100,000 people, the mortality rate due to heart disease is 204.2 per 100,000 people, and the percentage of adult residents who are obese is 26.2%.

Community comparison of disparities
According to the Fox Chase Cancer Center, a health disparity can be defined as the existence of inequalities that prevent certain members of a population group from benefiting from the same health status as other groups.  Cuyahoga County has many health disparities when comparing cities and demographics. The Hough neighborhood of Cleveland and the suburb of Lyndhurst can be compared to illustrate some of the disparities. The communities are both in Cuyahoga County and are less than 10 miles apart. They also have similar populations, but a different racial breakdown according to the 2010 census. The Hough neighborhood's population was 16,359 (96.1% Black or African American and 2.1% White American) and the Lyndhurst's population was 14,001 (6.4% Black or African American and 90.3% White American). A 24-year disparity was seen in life expectancy between the communities. Hough neighborhood residents have a life expectancy of 64 years and residents in Lyndhurst have a life expectancy of 88.5 years. The annual median income in the Hough neighborhood is $13,630 while it is $52,272 in Lyndhurst. Data collected from the Center for Community Solutions indicated from 1990 to 2001, the rate of heart disease for residents of the Hough neighborhood was around four times that of Lyndhurst residents. The Lyndhurst rate of accidental deaths was nine times higher than the Hough neighborhood.

Health facilities
 University Hospitals Ahuja Medical Center - Beachwood
 University Hospitals Bedford Medical Center - Bedford
 Cleveland Clinic - Cleveland
 Euclid Hospital - Euclid
 Fairview Hospital - Cleveland
 Hillcrest Hospital - Mayfield Heights
 Huron Hospital - East Cleveland
 University Hospitals Seidman Cancer Center - Cleveland
 Lakewood Hospital - Lakewood
 Lutheran Hospital - Cleveland
 University Hospitals MacDonald Women's Hospital - Cleveland
 Marymount Hospital - Garfield Heights
 MetroHealth Medical Center - Cleveland
 University Hospitals Parma Medical Center - Parma
 Rainbow Babies & Children's Hospital - Cleveland
 University Hospitals Richmond Medical Center - Richmond Heights
 South Pointe Hospital - Warrensville Heights
 Southwest General Health Center - Middleburg Heights
 St. Anne's Hospital, historical facility in Cleveland
 St. John Medical Center - Westlake
 St. Vincent Charity Medical Center - Cleveland
 University Hospitals Case Medical Center - University Circle, Cleveland
 Healthspan (formerly Kaiser Permanente of Northeast Ohio) - Bedford, Cleveland, Cleveland Heights, and Parma

Transportation

Airports
Cuyahoga County is served by international, regional, and county airports, including:
 Cuyahoga County Airport
 Cleveland Hopkins International Airport (Cleveland)
 Cleveland Burke Lakefront Airport (Cleveland)

Major highways

Rail
Cuyahoga County receives intercity passenger service by Amtrak by way of Lakefront Station in Cleveland, with destinations such as Chicago, New York, Boston, Washington, DC, and many more.

The Cuyahoga Valley Scenic Railroad offers scenic excursion service through the Cuyahoga Valley National Park by way of their Rockside Station in Independence.

Freight rail service is provided by Norfolk Southern, CSX Transportation, Wheeling and Lake Erie Railroad, Cleveland Commercial Railroad, and several other small companies. Norfolk Southern has the largest presence in the county, operating three different lines and several terminal yards.

Public transportation
The Greater Cleveland Regional Transit Authority, also known as RTA, provides public transportation to Cuyahoga County through a combination of conventional bus, rapid-transit bus, and rail transit services, as well as on-demand services. Several other county agencies also serve Cuyahoga County, mostly through downtown Cleveland.

Greyhound, Barons Bus Lines, and Megabus provide public transportation beyond Cuyahoga County to destinations across the United States.

Recreation
The Cleveland Metroparks system serves Cuyahoga County. The county is home to part of Cuyahoga Valley National Park, which extends southward into Summit County.

Culture

Theaters
 Beck Center (Lakewood)
 Cabaret Dada (Cleveland)
 Cassidy Theater (Parma Heights)
 Cleveland Play House (Cleveland)
 Cleveland Public Theater (Cleveland)
 Dobama Theater (Cleveland Heights)
 East Cleveland Theater (East Cleveland)
 Huntington Playhouse (Bay Village)
 Karamu House (Cleveland)
 Near West Theatre (Cleveland)
 Playhouse Square Center (Cleveland)

Classical music
 Cleveland Orchestra performs in Severance Hall

Museums
 Cleveland Museum of Art
 Museum of Contemporary Art, Cleveland
 Rock and Roll Hall of Fame
 Cleveland Museum of Natural History
 Maltz Museum of Jewish Heritage, Beachwood
 Great Lakes Science Center, Cleveland
 International Women Air and Space Museum Cleveland

Retail
Cuyahoga County has many options for shopping. Some of the well-known shopping areas include:

 Historically, downtown Cleveland, especially Euclid Avenue, has served as the major economic hub of the county and the entire metropolitan area. Other retail centers in Cleveland include Ohio City, Kamm's Corners, and Shaker Square.
 Beachwood Place stores include Saks Fifth Avenue, Nordstrom, Dillard's, Coach, H&M, and ZARA.
 Downtown Lakewood's commercial center spans from Bunts Avenue to the east and Arthur Avenue to the west along Detroit Avenue. 
 Lyndhurst Legacy Village stores include Crate & Barrel, Arhaus Furniture, Ethan Allen, Restoration Hardware, Nordstrom Rack, and the Cheesecake Factory.
 In North Olmsted, Great Northern Mall stores include Dillard's, Macy's, Dick's Sporting Goods,  JCPenney, and Forever 21.
 In Orange, Ohio, Pinecrest opened in spring 2018; its stores include Whole Foods, REI, West Elm, Pottery Barn, Williams Sonoma, and Orangetheory Fitness
 In Strongsville, SouthPark Mall stores include Dillard's, Macy's, Kohl's, Dick's Sporting Goods, Aldo, Chico's, Build-A-Bear Workshop, Forever 21, H&M, and Swarovski.
 In University Heights, University Square Shopping Center stores include Macy's and Target
 In Westlake, Crocker Park stores include Apple Store, Banana Republic, Nordstrom Rack, and Arhaus Furniture.
 In Woodmere, Eton Chagrin Boulevard stores include Anthropologie, Apple Store, Brooks Brothers, Tiffany & Co., The North Face, Orvis, Sur La Table, and Trader Joe's.

Communities

Cities

 Bay Village
 Beachwood
 Bedford
 Bedford Heights
 Berea
 Brecksville
 Broadview Heights
 Brook Park
 Brooklyn
 Cleveland (county seat)
 Cleveland Heights
 East Cleveland
 Euclid
 Fairview Park
 Garfield Heights
 Highland Heights
 Independence
 Lakewood
 Lyndhurst
 Maple Heights
 Mayfield Heights
 Middleburg Heights
 North Olmsted
 North Royalton
 Olmsted Falls
 Parma
 Parma Heights
 Pepper Pike
 Richmond Heights
 Rocky River
 Seven Hills
 Shaker Heights
 Solon
 South Euclid
 Strongsville
 University Heights
 Warrensville Heights
 Westlake

Villages

 Bentleyville
 Bratenahl
 Brooklyn Heights
 Chagrin Falls
 Cuyahoga Heights
 Gates Mills
 Glenwillow
 Highland Hills
 Hunting Valley
 Linndale
 Mayfield
 Moreland Hills
 Newburgh Heights
 North Randall
 Oakwood
 Orange
 Valley View
 Walton Hills
 Woodmere

Townships
 Chagrin Falls
 Olmsted
 Nineteen paper townships

Notable people
 

Margaret Barkley, politician

See also

 National Register of Historic Places listings in Cuyahoga County, Ohio

References

External links

 
 Cuyahoga County Home Page
 Cuyahoga County Planning Commission

 
1810 establishments in Ohio
Populated places established in 1810
Ohio counties in the Western Reserve